"You're So Strong" is a song by Australian pop rock band Mental As Anything, released in 1985 through Regular Records. It was released from the band's fifth studio album Fundamental The song was written by Guitarist Greedy Smith. The song first charted on 25 March 1985, peaked at No. 11  on the Kent Music Report, and stayed in the charts for eighteen weeks.

Track listing

Personnel 

 Martin Plaza – lead vocals, guitar
 Wayne de Lisle – drums
 Reg Mombassa – guitar, vocals
 Greedy Smith – lead vocals, keyboards, harmonica
 Peter O'Doherty – bass guitar, vocals

Charts

Weekly Charts

Year-end charts

References 

Mental As Anything songs
1985 songs
1985 singles
Songs written by Greedy Smith
Regular Records singles
CBS Records singles
Warner Music Group singles
Epic Records singles
Song recordings produced by Richard Gottehrer